The College of Beauvais (also known the  College of Dormans-Beauvais) was in Paris in what is now the Rue Jean de Beauvais. At the end of the 17th century and at the beginning of the 18th century, it was one of the leading schools of France, educating pupils whose parents were prominent in the French establishment.

History
The college was founded in 1370 by Jean de Dormans, Bishop of Beauvais and Chancellor of France. The Midsummer's Day Hall which remains standing today, was built in 1375 by Raymond du Temple, architect of Charles V of France. Later in 1381 he designed further buildings of the college.

In 1699, historian Charles Rollin was appointed principal of the Collège de Beauvais. He was succeeded in 1712 by Charles Coffin.

Alumni of the  College of Beauvais  include Jean Racine, Nicolas Boileau, Jean-Jacques Rousseau, Simone Nicolas Henri Linguet, Charles Perrault, Cyrano de Bergerac and Claude Nicolas Ledoux etc.

References

Buildings and structures completed in 1375
Defunct schools in France
Educational institutions established in the 14th century
History of Paris
1370 establishments in Europe
1370s establishments in France